Lochner is a surname. Notable people with the surname include:

Anita Lochner (born 1950), German actress
Augustus Lochner (1827–1865), English soldier
Butch Lochner (born 1931), former South African international rugby union player
Hannah Lochner (born 1993), Canadian actress
Johannes Lochner (born 1990), German bobsledder
Kunz Lochner (1510–1567), armourer
Louis P. Lochner (1887–1975), political activist
Otto Lochner, sprint canoeist
Robert Lochner (1904–1965), engineer
Robert Lochner (1918–2003), journalist
Rudolf Lochner (born 1953), former German bobsledder
Rupert Lochner (1891–1965), officer in the British Indian Army
Stefan Lochner (1400–1452), painter
Tom Lochner, basketball coach